The 2012 Puerto Rico Senate election was held on November 6, 2012, to elect the members of the Senate of Puerto Rico for the next four years, from January 2, 2013 until January 1, 2017.

The governing party (the PNP) presented 22 candidates to the Senate, 18 of them incumbents. The main opposing party (the PPD) presented 22 candidates as well, 5 of them incumbents. There were also 36 other candidates from the other minority parties, and one independent candidate.

After the election, the PNP had lost the majority of its seats, winning only 8 seats. The PPD won the majority of seats with 18. One candidate from the Puerto Rican Independence Party also won a minority seat.

Background

After the previous election, the New Progressive Party augmented their majority within the Senate of Puerto Rico with 22 seats versus only 5 seats from the Popular Democratic Party. By virtue of the Minority Law of the Constitution of Puerto Rico, four more senators from the PPD were added to complete a full minority. Also, for the first time in 27 years, the Puerto Rican Independence Party was left without a senator.

During the four years after the 2008 elections, the Senate of Puerto Rico was affected by scandals of corruption and ethics that resulted in the resignation of three members from the PNP delegation (Roberto Arango, Héctor Martínez, Antonio Soto Díaz). Also, one of the members of the PPD delegation (Eder Ortíz Ortíz) resigned to become Electoral Commissioner of the party. All four seats were filled before the elections.

Of the 31 seating senators, 2 were defeated in the primaries held in March for both parties, 2 decided to run for different positions, and 2 decided not to run for reelection. This resulted in 25 incumbent senators running for reelection (19 from the PNP, 6 from the PPD). In addition, 56 new candidates were running for seats for the six different parties, while two ran independent.

Summary

Change in composition

Senate composition before the elections

Senate composition as a result of the elections

Results

Senators at-large

|-
! style="background-color:#0080FF" |
| style="width: 130px" | New Progressive Party (PNP)
|               | Thomas Rivera Schatz
| 154,983
| 8.66
| +0.07
|-
! style="background-color:#FF0000" |
| style="width: 130px" | Popular Democratic Party (PPD)
|               | Eduardo Bhatia
| 149,781
| 8.37
| +1.64
|-
! style="background-color:#FF0000" |
| style="width: 130px" | Popular Democratic Party (PPD)
|               | Angel Rosa
| 139,132
| 7.78
| 
|-
! style="background-color:#FF0000" |
| style="width: 130px" | Popular Democratic Party (PPD)
|               | Antonio Fas Alzamora
| 138,275
| 7.73
| +0.82
|-
! style="background-color:#FF0000" |
| style="width: 130px" | Popular Democratic Party (PPD)
|               | Rossana López
| 136,914
| 7.65
| 
|-
! style="background-color:#FF0000" |
| style="width: 130px" | Popular Democratic Party (PPD)
|               | Aníbal José Torres
| 131,216
| 7.34
| 
|-
! style="background-color:#0080FF" |
| style="width: 130px" | New Progressive Party (PNP)
|               | Larry Seilhamer
| 129,918
| 7.26
| 
|-
! style="background-color:#0080FF" |
| style="width: 130px" | New Progressive Party (PNP)
|               | Itzamar Peña Ramírez
| 127,529
| 7.13
| -0.23
|-
! style="background-color:#0080FF" |
| style="width: 130px" | New Progressive Party (PNP)
|               | Margarita Nolasco
| 127,049
| 7.10
| -0.74
|-
! style="background-color:#01DF3A" |
| style="width: 130px" | Puerto Rican Independence Party (PIP)
|               | María de Lourdes Santiago
| 126,635
| 7.08
| +2.23
|-
! style="background-color:#FF0000" |
| style="width: 130px" | Popular Democratic Party (PPD)
|               | Cirilo Tirado Rivera
| 126,489
| 7.07
| +0.35
|-
|
|-
! style="background-color:#0080FF" |
| style="width: 130px" | New Progressive Party (PNP)
|               | Melinda Romero
| 126,122
| 7.05
| 
|-
! style="background-color:#0080FF" |
| style="width: 130px" | New Progressive Party (PNP)
|               | Lucy Arce
| 123,542
| 6.91
| -1.03
|-
! style="background-color:#008080" |
| style="width: 130px" | Movimiento Unión Soberanista (MUS)
|               | José "Che" Paraliticci
| 10,905
| 0.61
| 
|-
! style="background-color:#999999" |
| style="width: 130px" | Independent
|               | Herminio Pagán Calderín
| 9,133
| 0.51
| 
|-
! style="background-color:#800080" |
| style="width: 130px" | Worker's People Party of Puerto Rico (PPT)
|               | Ineabelle Colón
| 7,878
| 0.44
| 
|-
! style="background-color:#FFBF00" |
| style="width: 130px" | Puerto Ricans for Puerto Rico Party (PPR)
|               | Carmen M. Sánchez Betancourt
| 2,987
| 0.17
| 

Incumbent at-large senators Kimmey Raschke and José Emilio González (from the PNP) were defeated in the primaries held earlier in the year. Also, senator Alejandro García Padilla was running for Governor for the PPD, while Norma Burgos was running for Mayor of Caguas for the PNP. Senators Sila María González Calderón and Juan Eugenio Hernández Mayoral decided not to run for reelection.

After the election, two at-large incumbents from the PNP (Lucy Arce and Melinda Romero) lost, while the PPD managed to seat all their candidates to senators at-large. Also, María de Lourdes Santiago (from the PIP) regained a seat after losing her seat in the previous election.

Although the PPD won a majority of seats, the candidate with the most votes was the incumbent President of the Senate Thomas Rivera Schatz (from the PNP). PPD candidate Antonio Fas Alzamora won his tenth consecutive term as senator, becoming the longest tenured legislator in the island. On the other hand, candidates Angel Rosa, Rossana López, and Aníbal José Torres (from the PPD) won seats for the first time.

District

I - San Juan

|-
! style="background-color:#FF0000" |
| style="width: 130px" | Popular Democratic Party (PPD)
|               | José Nadal Power
| 98,225
| 24.69
| 
|-
! style="background-color:#FF0000" |
| style="width: 130px" | Popular Democratic Party (PPD)
|               | Ramón Luis Nieves
| 96,378
| 24.22
| 
|-
! style="background-color:#0080FF" |
| style="width: 130px" | New Progressive Party (PNP)
|               | Zoé Laboy
| 90,102
| 22.64
| 
|-
! style="background-color:#0080FF" |
| style="width: 130px" | New Progressive Party (PNP)
|               | Liza Fernández
| 88,633
| 22.27
| 
|-
! style="background-color:#01DF3A" |
| style="width: 130px" | Puerto Rican Independence Party (PIP)
|               | Héctor J. González Pereira
| 7,530
| 1.89
| +0.35
|-
! style="background-color:#01DF3A" |
| style="width: 130px" | Puerto Rican Independence Party (PIP)
|               | Angel Alicea Montañez
| 6,969
| 1.75
| 
|-
! style="background-color:#800080" |
| style="width: 130px" | Worker's People Party of Puerto Rico (PPT)
|               | José "Pepe" Córdova
| 3,646
| 0.92
| 
|-
! style="background-color:#008080" |
| style="width: 130px" | Movimiento Unión Soberanista (MUS)
|               | Isabel Borrás Marín
| 3,310
| 0.83
| 
|-
! style="background-color:#FFBF00" |
| style="width: 130px" | Puerto Ricans for Puerto Rico Party (PPR)
|               | Fred Guillont Juarbe
| 877
| 0.22
| 

PNP candidate Liza Fernández had been elected to the House of Representatives in the 2008 elections, but had won a special election to fill the vacant left by the resignation of Senator Roberto Arango. Zoé Laboy was running for the first time after serving as Secretary of the Department of Corrections in the 90s. The two candidates of the Popular Democratic Party (PPD), José Nadal Power and Ramón Luis Nieves were also newcomers. After the election, Nadal Power and Nieves won the two district seats that had been in control of the New Progressive Party (PNP) for two consecutive terms.

II - Bayamón

|-
! style="background-color:#0080FF" |
| style="width: 130px" | New Progressive Party (PNP)
|               | Migdalia Padilla
| 106,133
| 25.73
| -2.31
|-
! style="background-color:#0080FF" |
| style="width: 130px" | New Progressive Party (PNP)
|               | Carmelo Ríos
| 106, 125
| 25.73
| -1.90
|-
! style="background-color:#FF0000" |
| style="width: 130px" | Popular Democratic Party (PPD)
|               | Miguel Reyes Dávila
| 90,123
| 21.85
| 
|-
! style="background-color:#FF0000" |
| style="width: 130px" | Popular Democratic Party (PPD)
|               | José Orlando Muñoz
| 89,939
| 21.80
| 
|-
! style="background-color:#01DF3A" |
| style="width: 130px" | Puerto Rican Independence Party (PIP)
|               | Víctor M. Caraballo
| 6,494
| 1.57
| 
|-
! style="background-color:#01DF3A" |
| style="width: 130px" | Puerto Rican Independence Party (PIP)
|               | José A. Ojeda Santos
| 5,806
| 1.41
| 
|-
! style="background-color:#008080" |
| style="width: 130px" | Movimiento Unión Soberanista (MUS)
|               | Carlos Alberto Velázquez
| 2,598
| 0.63
| 
|-
! style="background-color:#800080" |
| style="width: 130px" | Worker's People Party of Puerto Rico (PPT)
|               | Ruth E. Arroyo Muñoz
| 2,559
| 0.62
|

III - Arecibo

|-
! style="background-color:#0080FF" |
| style="width: 130px" | New Progressive Party (PNP)
|               | Angel "Chayanne" Martínez
| 117,857
| 24.68
| -1.53
|-
! style="background-color:#0080FF" |
| style="width: 130px" | New Progressive Party (PNP)
|               | José "Joito" Pérez
| 117,297
| 24.56
| 
|-
! style="background-color:#FF0000" |
| style="width: 130px" | Popular Democratic Party (PPD)
|               | Wanda Arroyo
| 114,871
| 24.06
| 
|-
! style="background-color:#FF0000" |
| style="width: 130px" | Popular Democratic Party (PPD)
|               | Rubén Soto
| 112,674
| 23.60
| 
|-
! style="background-color:#01DF3A" |
| style="width: 130px" | Puerto Rican Independence Party (PIP)
|               | Jaime Bonel González
| 5,314
| 1.11
| +0.23
|-
! style="background-color:#01DF3A" |
| style="width: 130px" | Puerto Rican Independence Party (PIP)
|               | Luis Cruz
| 5,142
| 1.08
| 
|-
! style="background-color:#008080" |
| style="width: 130px" | Movimiento Unión Soberanista (MUS)
|               | Rafael Capella Angueira
| 1,735
| 0.36
|

IV - Mayagüez

|-
! style="background-color:#FF0000" |
| style="width: 130px" | Popular Democratic Party (PPD)
|               | María Teresa González
| 125,353
| 26.55
| 
|-
! style="background-color:#FF0000" |
| style="width: 130px" | Popular Democratic Party (PPD)
|               | Gilberto Rodríguez
| 121,396
| 25.71
| 
|-
! style="background-color:#0080FF" |
| style="width: 130px" | New Progressive Party (PNP)
|               | Luis Daniel Muñíz
| 105,666
| 22.38
| -3.31
|-
! style="background-color:#0080FF" |
| style="width: 130px" | New Progressive Party (PNP)
|               | Evelyn Vázquez
| 103,042
| 21.82
| -3.59
|-
! style="background-color:#01DF3A" |
| style="width: 130px" | Puerto Rican Independence Party (PIP)
|               | Orlando Ruíz Pesante
| 5,594
| 1.18
| 
|-
! style="background-color:#01DF3A" |
| style="width: 130px" | Puerto Rican Independence Party (PIP)
|               | Samuel Soto Bosques
| 5,483
| 1.16
| -0.57
|-
! style="background-color:#008080" |
| style="width: 130px" | Movimiento Unión Soberanista (MUS)
|               | Alberto O. Lozada Colón
| 1,461
| 0.33
| 
|-
! style="background-color:#800080" |
| style="width: 130px" | Worker's People Party of Puerto Rico (PPT)
|               | Edwin Morales Pérez
| 1,112
| 0.24
|

V - Ponce

|-
! style="background-color:#FF0000" |
| style="width: 130px" | Popular Democratic Party (PPD)
|               | Ramón Ruiz
| 113,499
| 24.43
| 
|-
! style="background-color:#FF0000" |
| style="width: 130px" | Popular Democratic Party (PPD)
|               | Martín Vargas Morales
| 112,974
| 24.32
| 
|-
! style="background-color:#0080FF" |
| style="width: 130px" | New Progressive Party (PNP)
|               | Luis Berdiel
| 111,806
| 24.07
| -1.44
|-
! style="background-color:#0080FF" |
| style="width: 130px" | New Progressive Party (PNP)
|               | Eliezer Velázquez
| 111,454
| 23.99
| 
|-
! style="background-color:#01DF3A" |
| style="width: 130px" | Puerto Rican Independence Party (PIP)
|               | Luis Enrique Martínez
| 6,246
| 1.34
| 
|-
! style="background-color:#01DF3A" |
| style="width: 130px" | Puerto Rican Independence Party (PIP)
|               | Javier Maldonado Mercado
| 5,972
| 1.29
|

VI - Guayama

|-
! style="background-color:#FF0000" |
| style="width: 130px" | Popular Democratic Party (PPD)
|               | Miguel Pereira
| 122,184
| 25.10
| 
|-
! style="background-color:#FF0000" |
| style="width: 130px" | Popular Democratic Party (PPD)
|               | Angel M. Rodríguez
| 120,336
| 24.72
| +1.99
|-
! style="background-color:#0080FF" |
| style="width: 130px" | New Progressive Party (PNP)
|               | Carlos Torres Torres
| 114,916
| 23.60
| -1.59
|-
! style="background-color:#0080FF" |
| style="width: 130px" | New Progressive Party (PNP)
|               | Miguel Rodríguez
| 113,877
| 23.39
| 
|-
! style="background-color:#01DF3A" |
| style="width: 130px" | Puerto Rican Independence Party (PIP)
|               | Edny Ramírez Pagán
| 5,287
| 1.20
| 
|-
! style="background-color:#01DF3A" |
| style="width: 130px" | Puerto Rican Independence Party (PIP)
|               | José Enrique Laboy Gómez
| 5,758
| 1.18
| 
|-
! style="background-color:#008080" |
| style="width: 130px" | Movimiento Unión Soberanista (MUS)
|               | Roberto Colón Ocasio
| 1,127
| 0.23
| 
|-
! style="background-color:#999999" |
| style="width: 130px" | Independent
|               | Benjamín "Bengie" León
| 200
| 0.04
|

VII - Humacao

|-
! style="background-color:#FF0000" |
| style="width: 130px" | Popular Democratic Party (PPD)
|               | José Luis Dalmau
| 117,610
| 26.37
| +2.65
|-
! style="background-color:#FF0000" |
| style="width: 130px" | Popular Democratic Party (PPD)
|               | Jorge Suárez
| 114,165
| 25.60
| +2.88
|-
! style="background-color:#0080FF" |
| style="width: 130px" | New Progressive Party (PNP)
|               | José Ramón Díaz
| 98,361
| 22.06
| -2.02
|-
! style="background-color:#0080FF" |
| style="width: 130px" | New Progressive Party (PNP)
|               | Luz M. Santiago
| 97,800
| 21.93
| -2.14
|-
! style="background-color:#01DF3A" |
| style="width: 130px" | Puerto Rican Independence Party (PIP)
|               | Maritza Algarín Sepúlveda
| 5,552
| 1.24
| 
|-
! style="background-color:#01DF3A" |
| style="width: 130px" | Puerto Rican Independence Party (PIP)
|               | Juan "Cholo" Lebrón
| 5,081
| 1.14
| +0.18
|-
! style="background-color:#008080" |
| style="width: 130px" | Movimiento Unión Soberanista (MUS)
|               | Vilma Calderón Jiménez
| 2,417
| 0.54
| 
|-
! style="background-color:#800080" |
| style="width: 130px" | Worker's People Party of Puerto Rico (PPT)
|               | Carlos R. Mercado Cotto
| 1,378
| 0.31
| 
|-
! style="background-color:#FFBF00" |
| style="width: 130px" | Puerto Ricans for Puerto Rico Party (PPR)
|               | José Luis "Tito" Dones
| 797
| 0.18
|

VIII - Carolina

|-
! style="background-color:#FF0000" |
| style="width: 130px" | Popular Democratic Party (PPD)
|               | Pedro A. Rodríguez
| 101,391
| 25.53
| 
|-
! style="background-color:#FF0000" |
| style="width: 130px" | Popular Democratic Party (PPD)
|               | Luis Daniel Rivera
| 100,080
| 25.20
| 
|-
! style="background-color:#0080FF" |
| style="width: 130px" | New Progressive Party (PNP)
|               | Lornna Soto
| 91,216
| 22.97
| -1.88
|-
! style="background-color:#0080FF" |
| style="width: 130px" | New Progressive Party (PNP)
|               | Roger Iglesias
| 86,584
| 21.80
| -1.10
|-
! style="background-color:#01DF3A" |
| style="width: 130px" | Puerto Rican Independence Party (PIP)
|               | Pedro José "Pepe" Alvarez
| 5,378
| 1.35
| -1.75
|-
! style="background-color:#01DF3A" |
| style="width: 130px" | Puerto Rican Independence Party (PIP)
|               | Dwight Rodríguez Orta
| 5,302
| 1.34
| +0.36
|-
! style="background-color:#008080" |
| style="width: 130px" | Movimiento Unión Soberanista (MUS)
|               | Guillermo Sosa Rodríguez
| 2,217
| 0.56
| 
|-
! style="background-color:#FFBF00" |
| style="width: 130px" | Puerto Ricans for Puerto Rico Party (PPR)
|               | Fabiola Carrasquillo
| 1,309
| 0.33
| -1.46
|-
! style="background-color:#FFBF00" |
| style="width: 130px" | Puerto Ricans for Puerto Rico Party (PPR)
|               | Edwin M. González
| 1,134
| 0.29
|

References

See also
 Puerto Rican general election, 2008
 Puerto Rican general election, 2012

Senate elections